2006 China Open can refer to:
2006 China Open (tennis)
2006 China Open (snooker)
2006 China Open (badminton)